Jerome Richard "Jerry" Johnston (born May 12, 1959) is an American evangelical Christian pastor, author, and docu-filmmaker. Johnston is currently vice president for Innovation and Strategic marketing at Houston Baptist University in Houston, Texas, and director of Christian Thinkers Society. Johnston and his wife Cristie Jo Huf Johnston are professors of theology and co-producers of a documentary in production about the "Nones" phenomenon.

Early life and education

Concurrent to Johnston’s senior year in high school, he took courses and graduated from Youth for Christ’s Christ Unlimited Bible Institute, and he ultimately received a General Equivalency Diploma. He was accepted on a scholarship to then named Liberty Baptist College in Lynchburg, Virginia. While at Liberty, Johnston became an "associate evangelist" for the college. Jerry received his B.A. from Midwestern Baptist College in Kansas City, Missouri, and his Master of Divinity from Midwestern Baptist Theological Seminary. In May 2012, Johnston and his wife each earned Doctor of Ministry degrees from Acadia Divinity College in Wolfville, Nova Scotia, an entity affiliated with the Convention of Atlantic Baptist Churches. Johnston's doctoral thesis is entitled An Exploration of Rates and Causes of Attrition among Protestant Evangelical Clergy in the United States. In 1998, Johnston delivered Liberty University's baccalaureate speech, and Liberty Baptist Theological Seminary awarded Johnston an honorary Doctor of Divinity degree. Johnston controversially used the title "Doctor" based on this honorary degree before earning even his undergraduate degree.

Career

Evangelism 
Among those converted in the Johnston crusade was the Texas evangelist Jay L. Lowder Jr. (born 1966), of Wichita Falls.

Pastor 
Launched in 1996, First Family Church saw exponential growth, and the church broke ground in 1999. The sanctuary was completed at a cost of $10.1 million. Another $8.5 million was spent in 2006 on expanded facilities. The congregation peaked at four thousand members and was described as among the fastest growing churches in America.

In 2007, the Kansas City Star reported issues relating to concerns over financial accountability within First Family Church, leading to hundreds of members leaving. In his doctoral dissertation, Johnston attributed the negative media attention to his political conservatism, such as his [[anti-abortion] convictions and his support for the Kansas constitutional amendment prohibiting same-sex marriage. In 2004, Johnston hosted Jerry Falwell, founder of Liberty University, at First Family Church to rally Christian support in the general election in which then U.S. President George W. Bush narrowly defeated John Kerry. At the gathering, Falwell encouraged pastors to be politically involved in their communities. After the constitutional amendment to ban gay marriage in Kansas passed in 2005, Johnston was highlighted as a proponent of the amendment and openly voiced his opposition to abortion. Journalist Jack Cashill, executive editor of Ingram’s Magazine, agreed with Johnston’s assertions that the pastor was a political media target because of his position as an influential conservative. Tax liens filed by the Internal Revenue Service related to more than $107,000 in unpaid payroll taxes from 2007 were resolved quickly in 2008. The Attorney General of Kansas investigated complaints but no violation of the Kansas Consumer Protection Act was found. A blog reported that Johnston ordered one church member asking for financial records to repent.

The elders of the church stated that even while the church was current in its monthly payments, Regions Bank accelerated the mortgage maturity from 30 to five years due to the 2008 banking crisis and demanded the full payment of the loan. The elder board said that AG Financial made a cash offer to Regions Bank to finance First Family Church's mortgage, but Regions Bank rejected the offer. Regions Financial Bank had not yet repaid the 2008 TARP (Troubled Asset Relief Program) loan from the federal government when it sold First Family Church’s loan to Blue Valley School District. The bank paid back its $3.5 billion in the spring of 2012. 2011 marked a dramatic increase of church property foreclosures; 138 churches were sold by banks compared to just 24 in 2008. 

The church closed in September 2012.

Books 
 The Edge of Evil (1989);
 Why Suicide? What Parents and Teachers Must Know to Save our Kids (1987);
 Going All the Way: The Real World of Teens and Sex (1988);
 It’s Killing Our Kids: Teenage Alcohol Abuse and Addiction (1990);
 The Last Days of Planet Earth (1991); 
 Who’s Listening: What our Kids are Trying to Tell Us (1992);
 Inspire your Kids to Greatness (1993);
 How to Save Your Kids From Ruin (1994).
 DANIEL Principles of Leadership, Success, and Achievement (2007)
 Apostasy Now: Similarities and Differences of Belief Systems (2007)
 Why They Die: Curing the Death Wish in our Kids (2012)

References

1959 births
Living people
20th-century Baptist ministers from the United States
21st-century Baptist ministers from the United States
Southern Baptist ministers
American non-fiction writers
American film producers
Writers from Oklahoma City
People from Overland Park, Kansas
People from Houston
American Christian creationists
Clergy from Oklahoma City
Baptists from Oklahoma